Sahib Bahadur is a 1977 Bollywood film directed by Chetan Anand.

Plot
In a small town of Chamba (Himachal Pradesh), situated in a picturesque Indian valley, lives a corrupt Deputy collector, Hare Murari, an equally corrupt Police Superintendent, Pasupathi; a doctor; a Judge; and Professor Rampyare. These officials always ensure that no one gets anything done without their permission, thus ensuring that their palms are adequately greased. When a young man named Prem Pratap seeks a license for conducting a song and dance sequence, he too is asked to bribe them, which he does. Subsequently, Hare Murari finds out that Prem Pratap may be a Government Official who has come incognito to investigate and expose them. Hare Murari's and the others worst fears are realized when they find out that Prem has been speaking long distance with none other than the President of India. What follows is hilarious chaos as the officials come together to try and portray themselves as honest and law-abiding citizens.

Soundtrack 

All songs are composed by Madan Mohan and lyrics are penned by Rajinder Krishan.

Cast & Characters

Trivia
 Chetan Anand directed his brother Dev Anand in an earlier version of the same movie, Afsar.
 This movie is based on the play by Nokolai Gogol.

Parts of the film are based on Cinderella - fairy godmother, evil step mom, and step sisters included.

References

External links
 

1977 films
1970s Hindi-language films
Films directed by Chetan Anand
Films scored by Madan Mohan